The 2019 Galway Intermediate Hurling Championship was the 61st staging of the Galway Intermediate Hurling Championship since its establishment by the Galway County Board in 1949. The championship began on 5 April 2019 and ended on 3 November 2019.

On 3 November 2019, Kinvara won the championship after a 1-10 to 0-12 defeat of Kilconieron in the final at Kenny Park. It was their second championship overall and their first title since 1966.

Results

Relegation playoffs

Quarter-finals

Semi-finals

Final

References

External links
 Galway GAA website

Galway Intermediate Hurling Championship
Galway Intermediate Hurling Championship